Marie-Christine Boutonnet (born 10 February 1949) is a National Front Member of the European Parliament representing Île-de-France.

References

1949 births
Living people
MEPs for Île-de-France 2014–2019
National Rally (France) MEPs
People from Albi